Julia Boynton Green (Boynton; May 25, 1861 – July 10, 1957) was an American author and poet. She is remembered as an "anti-modernist who railed against free verse". She was the author of a volume of poems entitled Lines and Interlines (1887), as well as two other books, This Enchanted Coast: Verse on California Themes (1928) and Noonmark (1936). She died in 1957.

Early life and education
Julia P. Boynton was born in South Byron, New York, May 25, 1861. Her father was James T. Boynton (d. 1889). She had at least one sibling, a sister, Mrs. A. H. Green. She was a descendant of Nathanial Greene, major general of the Continental Army in the American Revolutionary War.

When she was fifteen years old, she and her older sister entered Ingham University, in LeRoy, New York, where they remained a year as students. Another year was spent by both in preparation for Wellesley College. After entering that institution, they were called home after the father's death. Their interrupted course of study was continued for several years, chiefly in Nyack. She afterwards passed two winters in New York in the study of art, followed by a season in London, England.

Career
Most of Green's work appeared in local journals and in the Boston Transcript. In 1887, she published a volume of poems, Lines and Interlines (New York, 1887). In 1888, she was preparing for an extended tour in Europe, when she was called home by the illness of her mother, who subsequently died.  She married Levi Worthington Green in June, 1890, and after a six-months' tour in Europe, they made their home in Rochester, New York.

In 1893, she removed to Redlands, where her husband became a Southern California pioneer orange rancher and author. Their three children were Gladys, Boynton, and Norman. By 1929, the couple and their daughter had removed to Westwood, as their daughter was working as a librarian at University of California, Los Angeles.

She published a second book of poetry, This Enchanted Coast: Verse on California Themes, in 1928 in Los Angeles. Noonmark was published in Redlands, in 1936. In 1941, she received an honorable mention from the Los Angeles branch of the League of American Penwomen, as well as a prize from the national contest of American Penwomen.

Death and legacy
Julia P. Boynton Green died July 10, 1957, in Los Angeles, and is buried at Hollywood Forever Cemetery. Her papers and three unpublished books are collected at the Huntington Library. 

The L. Worthington Green/Julia Boynton Home, built in 1911, received the 1986 Heritage Award from the Redlands Area Historical Society.

Selected works

By Julia P. Boynton
 Lines and Interlines, 1887

By Julia Boynton Green
 This Enchanted Coast: Verse on California Themes, 1928
 Noonmark, 1936

Notes

References

Attribution

Bibliography

External links
 
 

1861 births
1957 deaths
19th-century American poets
19th-century American women writers
American women poets
People from Byron, New York
Poets from New York (state)
People from Redlands, California
Wikipedia articles incorporating text from A Woman of the Century